An acid–base titration is a method of quantitative analysis for determining the concentration of an acid or base by exactly neutralizing it with a standard solution of base or acid having known concentration. A pH indicator is used to monitor the progress of the acid–base reaction. If the acid dissociation constant (pKa) of the acid or base dissociation constant (pKb) of base in the analyte solution is known, its solution concentration (molarity) can be determined. Alternately, the pKa can be determined if the analyte solution has a known solution concentration by constructing a titration curve.

Alkalimetry and acidimetry
Alkalimetry and acidimetry are a kind of volumetric analysis in which the fundamental reaction is a neutralization reaction. Acidimetry is the specialized analytic use of acid-base titration to determine the concentration of a basic (synonymous to alkaline) substances using standard acid. Alkalimetry, is the same concept of specialized analytic acid-base titration, but for an acidic substance using standard base.

Indicator choice

A suitable pH indicator must be chosen in order to detect the end point of the titration. The colour change or other effect should occur close to the equivalence point of the reaction so that the experimenter can accurately determine when that point is reached. The pH of the equivalence point can be estimated using the following rules:
 A strong acid will react with a strong base to form a neutral (pH = 7) solution.
 A strong acid will react with a weak base to form an acidic (pH < 7) solution.
 A weak acid will react with a strong base to form a basic (pH > 7) solution.
When a weak acid reacts with a weak base, the equivalence point solution will be basic if the base is stronger and acidic if the acid is stronger. If both are of equal strength, then the equivalence pH will be neutral. However, weak acids are not often titrated against weak bases because the colour change shown with the indicator is often quick, and therefore very difficult for the observer to see the change of colour.

The point at which the indicator changes colour is called the endpoint.  A suitable indicator should be chosen, preferably one that will experience a change in colour (an endpoint) close to the equivalence point of the reaction.

Mathematical analysis: titration of weak acid

The pH of a weak acid solution being titrated with a strong base solution can be found at different points along the way. These points fall into one of four categories:
 initial pH
 pH before the equivalence point
 pH at the equivalence point
 pH after the equivalence point
for more rigorous calculation, using a RICE chart is required. In fact the equations below are a simplification of the RICE chart.

Single formula 
More accurately, a single formula that describes the titration of a weak acid with a strong base from start to finish is given below:

 

 
where
" φ = fraction of completion of the titration (φ < 1 is before the equivalence point, φ = 1 is the equivalence point, and φ > 1 is after the equivalence point)
  = the concentrations of the acid and base respectively
  = the volumes of the acid and base respectively
  = the fraction of the weak acid that is ionized
  = the dissociation constant for the acid
  = concentrations of the H+ and OH– ions respectively

Gallery

Graphical methods
The titration process creates solutions with compositions ranging from pure acid to pure base. Identifying the pH associated with any stage in the titration process is relatively simple for monoprotic acids and bases.  The presence of more
than one acid or base group complicates these computations. Graphical methods, such as the equiligraph, have long been used to account for the interaction of coupled equilibria.

See also 
 Henderson–Hasselbalch equation
 Gran plot (also known as Gran titration or the Gran method)

References

External links

 Graphical method to solve acid-base problems, including titrations
 Graphic and numerical solver for general acid-base problems - Software Program for phone and tablets 
 

Titration